Anthidium tenuiflorae is a species of bee in the family Megachilidae, the leaf-cutter, carder, or mason bees.

Distribution
Middle America and North America

Synonyms
Synonyms for this species include:
Anthidium tenuiflorae yukonense Cockerell, 1926

References

External links

Anatomical illustrations and photos

tenuiflorae
Insects described in 1907